Olga Tishchenko (born May 6, 1973) is a Soviet-born, Russian sprint canoer who competed from the early 1990s to the early 2000s (decade). She won a silver medal in the K-4 200 m event at the 1999 ICF Canoe Sprint World Championships in Milan.

Tishchenko also competed in three Summer Olympics. For the Unified Team at the 1992 Summer Olympics in Barcelona, she finished ninth in the K-4 500 m event. Four years later in Atlanta, Tishchenko finished seventh in the K-4 500 m event for Russia. She would finish seventh in the K-4 500 m event for Russia again at the 2000 Summer Olympics in Sydney.

References

Sports-reference.com profile

1973 births
Canoeists at the 1992 Summer Olympics
Canoeists at the 1996 Summer Olympics
Canoeists at the 2000 Summer Olympics
Living people
Olympic canoeists of Russia
Olympic canoeists of the Unified Team
Russian female canoeists
Soviet female canoeists
ICF Canoe Sprint World Championships medalists in kayak